Abderrahmane Mehdaoui (7 October 1949 – 13 September 2022) was an Algerian football player and manager who managed the Algeria national team, as well as club sides WA Tlemcen, AGS Mascara and DRB Tadjenanet.

Mehdaoui died on 13 September 2022, at the age of 72.

References

External links
 

1949 births
2022 deaths
21st-century Algerian people
Algerian footballers
NA Hussein Dey players
Algerian football managers
WA Tlemcen managers
GC Mascara managers
DRB Tadjenanet managers
1998 African Cup of Nations managers
Algeria national football team managers
Association footballers not categorized by position
People from Algiers Province